Sainte-Bazeille is a commune in the Lot-et-Garonne department, administrative region of Nouvelle-Aquitaine (before 2015: Aquitaine), southwestern France. Sainte-Bazeille station has rail connections to Agen, Langon and Bordeaux.

See also
Communes of the Lot-et-Garonne department

References

Saintebazeille